The Fuchu Himba Stakes (Japanese 府中牝馬ステークス) is a Grade 2 horse race for Thoroughbred fillies and mares aged three and over run in October over a distance of 1800 metres at Tokyo Racecourse.

It was first run in 1953 and was promoted to Grade 3 in 1984 before being run as a Group 2 race since 2011. The race was usually contested over 1600 metres before being moved up to 1800 metres in 1996. The race serves as a trial for the Queen Elizabeth II Cup

Winners since 2000 

 The 2002 race took place at Nakayama Racecourse.

Earlier winners

 1984 - Dyna Mina
 1985 - Western Five
 1986 - Dyna Fairy
 1987 - Love Chic Blues
 1988 - Dyna Artemis
 1989 - Louisiana Pit
 1990 - Hikaru Dancer
 1991 - Restoration
 1992 - Janis
 1993 - North Flight
 1994 - Hokkai Seres
 1995 - Samani Beppin
 1996 - Sakura Candle
 1997 - Kurokami
 1998 - Mejiro Dober
 1999 - Erimo Excel

See also
 Horse racing in Japan
 List of Japanese flat horse races

References

Turf races in Japan